Sundown is a national park in Queensland, Australia, 198 km south west of Brisbane. The park contains spectacular gorge country and a number of peaks higher than 1,000 m.

Landforms
It is the source of the Severn River, which is the starting point of the Darling River.  This Severn River is a separate river from the New South Wales river of the same name. The river has cut a 10 km long gorge through hard trap rock. Some of the Severn River's tributaries have carved gorges and contain waterfalls.

The area has a complex geological history. Before it was a national park the land was mined for molybdenite, arsenic, tungsten, copper, gold and tin. Disused mines are contaminated so access in these locations is restricted. Shellfish fossils can be found on the summit of Mount Donaldson which is 1,038 m above sea level. The trap rock which underlays most of the park contains granite intrusions which has caused some fracturing.

Flora and fauna
In the north of the park stringybark, yellow box, brown box and Tenterfield woollybutt are the most common trees. Along the river red river gum, river oak, tea-tree and bottlebrush are typically found. Some areas of the park were cleared for grazing and the production of wool.

At least 150 species of bird have been noted in the park, including the northernmost population of superb lyrebirds. The park is also home to the most northerly population of wombats along with nearby Girraween National Park. Tiger quolls and platypus are other species that may also be found.

Facilities
In the south east of the park at Broadwater campground there are facilities for camping. Bush camping is permitted. Camping permits and fees apply in both cases.  There are a number of short and long walking tracks in the park.

Western Section
Access to the park from New South Wales is via a turn-off into Mingoola Station Road at the Mingoola School, along the Bruxner Highway. Then turn right into Glenyon Dam Road and then another right into Permanents Road, which promptly enters the park. This section is the most developed with the Broadwater Camping Area providing toilets, boil-your-own hot showers (boiler on site), short walking tracks, sheltered tables and taps with river and rain water provided at the ranger station. This section is easily accessible for 2WD and motorhomes/caravans/campertrailers under 5 meters.

See also

 Protected areas of Queensland

References

External links

Sundown National Park - Queensland Holidays, Tourism Queensland

National parks of Queensland
Darling Downs
Protected areas established in 1977
1977 establishments in Australia